N. G. Hulkur is a village in the Kolar Gold Fields Taluk of Kolar district in Karnataka, India. It is situated about 25 kilometers from Kolar Gold Fields, situated very close to Andhra Pradesh border.

Demographics 
According to the 2011 Indian Census, the village consists of 2,432 people. The town has a literacy rate of 52.71 percent which is lower than Karnataka's average of 75.36 percent.

References

Villages in Kolar district